Antonio Ortega Franco (22 December 1941 – 1 February 2022) was a Mexican Roman Catholic prelate.

Ortega Franco was born in Mexico and was ordained to the priesthood in 1968. He served as titular bishop of Lete and as auxiliary bishop of the Roman Catholic Archdiocese of Mexico City, Mexico, from 2004 to his retirement in 2019. He died on 1 February 2022, at the age of 80.

References

1941 births
2022 deaths
21st-century Roman Catholic bishops in Mexico